The Nile Conference of the 2022 BAL season began on 9 April 2022 and ended on 19 April 2022. In a group of six teams, all teams played each other one time. The top four teams in the standings advanced to the 2022 BAL Playoffs.

All games were hosted in the Hassan Moustafa Sports Hall in Cairo, Egypt. The teams and schedule were revealed on 8 February.

Standings

Games
All times are in Egypt Standard Time (GMT+2).

9 April

10 April

12 April

13 April

15 April

16 April

18 April

19 April

References

Nile Conference
BAL Nile Conference
BAL
Sports competitions in Cairo